The 1985 Scotland rugby union tour of North America was a series of nine matches played by the Scotland national rugby union team in Canada and the United States in May 1985. The Scotland team won four of their matches and lost one. Four of the five matches were played in Canada, and Scotland did not play either the Canada national rugby union team or the United States national rugby union team.

Matches 
Scores and results list Scotland's points tally first.

Touring party

Manager: G. B. Masson
Coach: Colin Telfer
Assistant Manager: Derrick Grant
Captain: David Leslie

Backs
Peter Dods
Gavin Hastings
Peter Steven
Iwan Tukalo
Brian Edwards
Keith Murray
Alan Tait
Douglas Wyllie
Colin Gass
Andrew Ker
D. Bryson
D. MacDonald

Forwards
John Jeffrey
David Leslie
Sean McGaughey
Iain Paxton
Derek Turnbull
Alister Campbell
Hugh Parker
Tom Smith
Alan Tomes
Rob Cunningham
Kenny Milne
Alex Brewster
Iain Milne
Norrie Rowan

References

Scotland rugby union tour
Scotland national rugby union team tours
Rugby union tours of Canada
Rugby union tours of the United States
tour